Wellington Phoenix Football Club is a professional football club based in Wellington, New Zealand. It competes in the Australian A-League, under licence from Football Federation Australia. Phoenix entered the competition in the 2007–08 season after its formation in March 2007, by New Zealand Football to replace New Zealand Knights as a New Zealand-based club in the Australian A-League competition. The club is one of the few clubs in the world to compete in a league of a different confederation (AFC) from that of the country where it is based (OFC).

The club's highest achievement is reaching the A-League Preliminary Final in 2010. The club plays matches at Sky Stadium (formerly Westpac Stadium), a 34,500-seat multi-purpose venue in Wellington. Their home kit consists of black and yellow stripes.

History

Foundation
During the later stages of the 2006–07 A-League season, Football Federation Australia (FFA) removed New Zealand Knights A-League licence due to the club's financial and administrative problems and poor on-field performance. After the resignation of the New Zealand Knights board, FFA transferred the licence to New Zealand Soccer (NZS, now New Zealand Football), which administered the club for the rest of the season before its subsequent dissolution.

FFA then provided NZS a provisional A-League licence to sub-let to a suitable New Zealand team to enter the 2007–08 A-League season. FFA set an application deadline to NZS and subsequently delayed that deadline to give more time for potential applicants in New Zealand to apply along with NZS support.

While NZS was given a chance to apply with a new sub-licensee, a Townsville-based consortium, Tropical Football Australia (TFA) also expressed interest and prepared an A-League application to replace the place previously held by the Knights. However, TFA eventually pulled out with the understanding of the FFA's preference to retain a New Zealand team for the league. TFA resubmitted its bid the following year as a potential A-League expansion franchise under the name "Northern Thunder FC", which was later changed to "North Queensland Thunder"; however, this bid died after expansion for the 2007–08 season was cancelled.

After much delay, the final amount needed for the application came from Wellington property businessman Terry Serepisos in the latter stages of the bid. Serepisos, the club's majority owner and chairman, provided NZD $1,250,000 to ensure the beginnings of a new New Zealand franchise and a continuation of New Zealand's participation in the A-League. FFA finalised a three-year A-League licence to New Zealand Football who then sub-let the licence to the Wellington-based club. The new Wellington club was confirmed on 19 March 2007.

The name for the new club was picked from a shortlist of six, pruned from 250 names suggested by the public, and was announced on 28 March 2007. Serepisos said of the name, that "It symbolises the fresh start, the rising from the ashes, and the incredible Wellington support that has come out".

Despite the backing of FIFA, AFC president Mohammed Bin Hammam stated that due to AFC criteria, the Wellington team must move to Australia or disband by 2011. However, in an interview aired on SBS on 21 December 2008, FIFA president Sepp Blatter stated unequivocally, "It is not the matter of the Confederation, it is the matter of the FIFA Executive Committee... If Wellington will go on play on in Australian League, then as long as Australian league wants to have them and Wellington wants to stay (and) Both association in this case, New Zealand Soccer and Australian Football are happy with that then we will give them the blessing. The Confederation cannot interfere with that.".

Rise of the Phoenix
In the 2009–10 season, Wellington Phoenix became the first New Zealand side to reach the playoffs of an Australian football competition when Adelaide United beat Brisbane Roar 2–0 in the 26th round. It meant that Brisbane, which before the match was the only team outside the top six with a chance of making the playoffs, no longer could. The Phoenix overcame the Central Coast Mariners on 12 February 2010 to finish fourth, which meant it would host a playoff game against Perth Glory on 21 February 2010. The Phoenix beat Perth by penalty shootout (4–2) after 120 minutes (including 30 minutes of extra time). Phoenix then hosted a home game against Newcastle Jets on 7 March, which they won in extra time 3–1.

In the Preliminary Final against Sydney FC, the Phoenix lost 4–2 in controversial circumstances. After being locked at 1–1 through goals from Chris Payne for Sydney and Andrew Durante for Wellington, Payne apparently missed a header and deflected the ball into the goal off his hand. Andrew Durante, who was marking Payne went straight to the linesman, but the goal stood. "I went straight to the linesman. I knew 100 per cent it was handball. I spoke to the ref at halftime about it and he said it wasn't deliberate. It's pretty funny that one. Such a big game and such a big occasion, for something like that to change the game is very disappointing." Sydney FC strikers Alex Brosque and Mark Bridge both scored break-away goals as Phoenix pushed forward, and Eugene Dadi added a late consolation goal. Phoenix striker Chris Greenacre said that the error changed the dynamics of the game. "It just rips the heart out of you. We got back in the game with a good goal and that takes it away from you. It wasn't to be. I think we were right back in it. They played some good football but I thought we had withstood it OK. If we went into halftime [at 1–1] we were really confident we could get something out of it." Coach Ricki Herbert echoed those statements. The loss brought the end to the Phoenix's season, meaning that Melbourne Victory and Sydney FC would compete in the Grand Final.

On 20 April 2010, FFA granted Wellington Phoenix a five-year licence extension, keeping it in the competition until at least the conclusion of the 2015–16 season.

Many argue Wellington's ability to play in the A-League as being instrumental to the progress of the New Zealand national side and the wider football landscape.

Change of ownership
Prior to the 2011/12 season, it emerged that Serepisos was experiencing financial difficulties, both personally and in the property empire. This included highly publicised action by the Inland Revenue Department to liquidate a number of Serepisos' companies for unpaid taxes, including Century City Football Ltd, the club Serepisos owned the Phoenix through.

Initially, Serepisos claimed he had obtained finance through Swiss-based lenders, then announced he had agreed to a deal with Western Gulf Advisory, the Bahrain-based lender owned by Racing Santander owner Ahsan Ali Syed which would see 50% of the club sold. However, these funds were never received and the partial transfer never took place.

While the liquidation action was resolved through an unnamed third-party Serepisos' financial troubles did not end. Despite this, he stated he would not give up ownership of the club. Additional stories also emerged that coach Ricki Herbert was personally owed $100,000 in unpaid wages by the club.

However, on 23 September 2011, it was announced by Serepisos and the FFA that Serepisos had relinquished ownership of the club as a result of his ongoing financial difficulties. The club's licence was passed by the FFA to a new consortium of seven Wellington businessman headed by Rob Morrison and including Gareth Morgan, Lloyd Morrison and John Morrison.

Change of head coach
On 26 February 2013, with the Phoenix sitting in last place, Ricki Herbert resigned from the position of head coach. The Phoenix had endured a poor run of results in a season where they were expected to be challenging for the title. Assistant Coach Chris Greenacre took the reins on an interim basis for the remainder of the season. Following a "worldwide search", Ernie Merrick was announced as the head coach on 20 May 2013. Merrick had six successful years at the Melbourne Victory, which was seen as important. Merrick will once again become the most experienced A-League coach in the coming season, retaking this from Herbert who passed him towards the end of the 2012–13 season. Greenacre was retained by Merrick as the assistant coach.

On 5 December 2017, Merrick resigned as head coach following the Phoenix's 2–0 loss to Adelaide United. On 2 January 2017, Des Buckingham took over as head coach, while Chris Greenacre was made co-coach.

On 1 March 2018, Wellington Phoenix announced that Darije Kalezic will be departing the club at the end of the season after they were not able to come to an agreement on how the club proceeds forward for the next season.

Rudan era
On 30 May 2018, Wellington Phoenix announced the appointment of former Sydney FC captain Mark Rudan as manager on a two-year contract. Mark Rudan became the first-ever Wellington Phoenix coach to win his first game in charge when the Wellington Phoenix were 2–1 victors over Newcastle Jets in the opening round of the 2018–19 season. Following Round 2 clash with Brisbane Roar which ended in a 0–0 draw, it was the best start the team has had since the 2012/13 season. They suffered their first defeat of the season in Round 3 going down 3–0 to Western Sydney Wanderers. After a defeat in Round 5 against Adelaide United, Phoenix went on a 9-game undefeated streak including draws with Premiers Perth Glory and Champions Melbourne Victory, and wins over clubs like Sydney FC and Newcastle Jets. Their streak was broken by Sydney FC in round 15. The Phoenix finished in 6th place qualifying for the playoffs. On 15 April, it was announced that Rudan would not see out the second year of his contract and would leave at season's end due to personal reasons. They were knocked out in the first elimination final by Melbourne Victory 3–1.

Talay era

On 4 May 2019, it was announced Ufuk Talay would be taking the reins of head coach after the departure of Mark Rudan on a one-year deal. In his first press conference, Talay expressed his idea of building a young team with a strong Kiwi core. He made his first signing with All Whites goalkeeper Stefan Marinovic and signed local Kiwi players, Te Atawhai Hudson-Wihongi, Tim Payne, and Callum McCowatt. Talay made his first import signing with Mexican Ulises Dávila following another import signing of English striker, David Ball. On 24 July, it was announced that Steven Taylor would be the captain heading into the new season while Alex Rufer was made vice-captain. On 18 August, it was announced that Phoenix had paid an undisclosed fee for Reno Piscopo, marking the first time the club paid a transfer fee for a player. Talay also made a handful of signings of young Australian players including Walter Scott, Jaushua Sotirio, Cameron Devlin, Liam McGing, and experienced centre-back Luke DeVere. Talay used his fourth import spot signing Matti Steinmann on a one-year deal. Talay had a positive start to his managerial tenure with the Wellington Phoenix when he led them to a 7–0 victory over Wairarapa United in a pre-season friendly in his first match in charge.

They were knocked-out of the 2019 FFA Cup in the Round of 32, losing 4–2 on penalties to Brisbane Strikers, after making an extraordinary comeback from 2-0 down to a 2–2 draw at full time.

On 22 May 2021, Wellington Phoenix broke their home attendance record, attracting 24,105 spectators against Western United FC. This game (as of 22 May), is the 2020/21 Hyundai A-League's most attended game. This was the first A-League game to be held in New Zealand since 15 March 2020, a total of 433 days in between.

Colours and badge

The general consensus among Phoenix fans was for a kit featuring yellow and black vertical stripes; however, this format did not comply with the A-League template required by Reebok when Phoenix was admitted into the League. Instead, players wore a predominantly black strip with yellow and white trim for the first two seasons. When Reebok lifted constraints on kit designs in 2009, Phoenix adopted yellow and black vertical stripes. The Phoenix kit is currently provided by Paladin after Adidas decided against renewing their contract with the club. The badge is a shield depicting a rising phoenix.

The team's current kit sponsors are KPMG (front of kit), Sky Sports (back of shirt), GoMedia (front of shorts), and Revera (back of shorts).

In August 2017, the club unveiled a new badge removing the shield in place of a larger, simplified phoenix. The updated badge also featured the club's new motto of 'E Rere Te Keo', a rising call rooted in the Māori legend of Taniwha.

Stadium

Wellington Phoenix FC has played most of its home matches at the Wellington Regional Stadium (currently named Sky Stadium for sponsorship reasons), which is referred to as the 'Ring of Fire' by fans. The stadium has a capacity of 34,500. The NZD$130 million stadium was built in 1999 by Fletcher Construction and is situated close to major transport facilities (such as Wellington railway station) one kilometre north of the central business district.

The stadium is owned and operated by Wellington Regional Stadium Trust. It is built on surplus-to-requirements reclaimed railway land on Wellington's waterfront.

Home fans sit in the southern and western areas of the stadium, while away fans sit to the north.

In the 2009–2010 A-League season, Wellington Phoenix FC played two home games away from Sky Stadium, the first at Arena Manawatu in Palmerston North, the second at AMI Stadium in Christchurch. The two games were key to Wellington Phoenix expanding their fan base in New Zealand. This was followed by playing a game in Auckland at Eden Park in front of 20,078 attendees during the 2011–2012 A-League season.

The Phoenix previously trained at Newtown Park, on a ground that was specially redeveloped in 2008 and separate to the playing pitch. This ground was shared with NZFC franchise, Team Wellington however in 2017 the Phoenix moved to Martin Luckie Park which had been redeveloped with two full-sized sand-based pitches. Funding for the redevelopment came from the Phoenix as well as $550,000 given by Wellington City Council.

Due to COVID-19 in both New Zealand and Australia, the Wellington Phoenix based themselves in Wollongong and played home games at WIN Stadium for the 2020–21 A-League season. Wellington returned to Wollongong for the 2021–22 A-League season and again played their home games at Win Stadium.

Supporters

Wellington Phoenix has built a strong fan-base in Wellington, across New Zealand, and amongst New Zealanders in Australia. The main supporters' group, named the Yellow Fever, was founded a day after the Wellington Phoenix's formation was announced. Yellow Fever founder Mike Greene met with the founder of New Zealand cricket supporter group, the Beige Brigade, to get ideas of how to get the group started. The name was originally chosen on the assumption that the new Wellington-based team would play in a yellow playing strip (yellow being the dominant sporting colour of the region). Although the eventual strip was primarily black, the Yellow Fever elected to retain the name; many Yellow Fever members chose to wear yellow to fixtures as opposed to black. The 'Fever Zone' is located within aisles 21 and 22 of Sky Stadium; although it is an all-seater facility, most Yellow Fever members choose to stand in front of their seat – similar to terrace seating traditions in British football.

The Yellow Fever are renowned within the A-League for their traditions; the most prominent of which being if the Phoenix are winning by the 80th minute, members remove their shirts. Additionally, prior to the last home game before Christmas, the Yellow Fever organise a pub crawl, entitled The 12 Pubs of Lochhead after defender Tony Lochhead.

Many Yellow Fever members have also lent their support to other football fixtures in Wellington and New Zealand, mostly notably Team Wellington of the ISPS Handa Premiership and the New Zealand national football team. Yellow Fever also lent its support to the New Zealand women's national under-17 football team during the 2008 FIFA U-17 Women's World Cup, held in New Zealand.

The Yellow Fever website, yellowfever.co.nz, has evolved into a community page for New Zealand football in general. The site publishes non-Phoenix news involving football at local and national levels, as well as information on all New Zealand national teams and footballers.

The former official podcast of Yellow Fever, 'Phoenix City', is hosted by Patrick Barnes, and features Cameron McIntosh and Andrew French as panellists. The weekly recording often includes a guest interview and covers the Wellington Phoenix, the All Whites and other national teams, New Zealanders playing overseas, the ISPS Handa Premiership, and local club football, including the Chatham Cup.

The Yellow Fever supporters share a strong relationship with the club due to their charity initiatives. Yellow Fever is the first supporters club in the A-League to organise and sponsor an annual footballing scholarship. The "Retro Ricki Youth Scholarship" was awarded annually to a promising young New Zealand footballer. Nominations for the scholarship were made by Yellow Fever members, and the recipient was chosen by the Yellow Fever executive and Wellington Phoenix staff. The recipient received a trial with the Phoenix, covering travel and accommodation costs. Although the initiative only lasted four seasons, the scholarship is widely credited with bringing New Zealand international Marco Rojas professional attention.

 2007: Stefan Kousoulas, Otago United
 2008: Daniel Findlay, Three Kings United
 2009: Marco Rojas, Melville United
 2010: Thomas Spragg, Auckland City FC, and Tristan Prattley, Otago United

Yellow Fever members have also combined charity campaigns with their support of the Phoenix, with supporters selling bandannas in the club colours every year as part of the youth-cancer charity CanTeen's "Bandana Day" fundraiser. Yellow Fever members have also notably participated in the Movember movement since 2007, leading to the club itself participating as of 2008, and other Australian A-League clubs following suit in 2009.

In 2010, Yellow Fever, The Dominion Post and local sportswear chain RYOS teamed up to release the "LifeFlight Shirt", a white T-shirt emblazoned with pictures of Phoenix players sent into the Dominion Post as part of a competition. 25% of the proceeds from the sale of these T-shirts were donated to the LifeFlight air ambulance service.

Players

First-team squad

Other players with first-team appearances

Reserves and youth academy

Wellington Phoenix's academy system was formed in 2013, absorbing the prolific Christchurch-based Asia-Pacific Football Academy. Since then, Wellington Phoenix have developed a number of notable players, including several New Zealand internationals.

The following players graduated from the Wellington Phoenix Football Academy, and have either represented New Zealand at international level or have played at a professional level outside New Zealand.

 Tyler Boyd
 Eugenio Pizzuto
 Calvin Harris
 Sarpreet Singh
 Liberato Cacace
 James McGarry
 Logan Rogerson
 Joe Bell
 Max Mata
 Oliver Whyte
 Ben Waine

Club officials

Technical staff

Management
Updated 26 March 2019.

Captaincy history

Managers

Key
  Caretaker appointment
  Initial caretaker appointments promoted to full-time manager
 Manager dates, statistics and nationalities are sourced from WorldFootball.net and Ultimatealeague.com

Women's team

In June 2020, Wellington Phoenix announced their desire in creating a women's team before the 2023 FIFA Women's World Cup as part of a A-League Women plan of adding three expansion clubs by the said period and in September 2021, they announced the newly created team would be joining the A-League as an expansion starting with the 2021–22 season. This made Phoenix the first women's professional football team from New Zealand.

Honours

Cups
 A-League Pre-Season Challenge Cup
 Runners-up: 2008

End-of-season awards

Records and statistics

Player
 Most League appearances: 273,  Andrew Durante
 Most appearances in a single season: 31,  Chris Greenacre, 2010–11
 All-time leading goalscorer: 51,  Roy Krishna
 Most goals in a season: 18,  Roy Krishna, 2018–19 (26 appearances)

Team
 First League match: v Melbourne Victory, 26 August 2007 (drew 2–2)
 First goalscorer: Daniel v Melbourne Victory, 26 August 2007
 First win: v. Sydney FC, 14 September 2007 (won 2–1)
 Biggest victory: 
6–0 v Gold Coast United, 25 October 2009
8–2 v Central Coast Mariners, 9 March 2019
 Biggest defeat: 
7–1 v Sydney FC, 19 January 2013
6–0 v Melbourne City, 2 April 2022
 Most wins in a row: 5 matches; 30 January 2010 – 7 March 2010
 Most losses in a row: 9 matches; 20 March 2016 – 31 October 2016
 Highest home attendance: 32,792 v Newcastle United Jets on 7 March 2010
 Highest regular season attendance: 24,105 v Western United at Sky Stadium, Wellington on 22 May 2021
 Highest friendly attendance: 31,853 v Los Angeles Galaxy on 1 December 2007
 Highest average attendance in a season: 11,683 – 2007–08 season
 Lowest home attendance: 3,898 v Perth Glory FC on 8 January 2012

Season by season record

See also
New Zealand Football
Football Kingz FC
New Zealand Knights FC
ASB Phoenix Challenge

References

External links

 
A-League Men teams
Wellington Phoenix
Association football clubs established in 2007
Expatriated football clubs
Sport in Wellington City
2007 establishments in New Zealand
Phoenix clubs (association football)